Elections to North Lanarkshire Council took place on 5 May 2022 on the same day as the 31 other Scottish local government elections. The election used the 21 wards created following the Local Government Boundary Commission for Scotland's 5th Review, with 77 councillors being elected. Each ward elected either 3 or 4 members, using the STV electoral system.

At the last election in 2017, the Scottish National Party (SNP) won the most seats, but Labour ran the council.

This election saw the British Unionist Party gain its first ever representation in Scotland, taking a seat from the Conservatives in the Fortissat ward.

Background

Composition
Since the previous election, several changes in the composition of the council occurred. Most were changes to the political affiliation of councillors including SNP councillor Paddy Hogg and Labour councillors Angela Feeney, Gillian Fannan, Willie Doolan and Tommy Morgan who resigned from their respective parties to become independents. SNP councillors Lynne Anderson, David Baird and Shahid Farooq defected to the Alba Party.

Conservative councillor Stephen Goldsack was expelled from the party for his previous connections to the British National Party and SNP councillor Mark Kerr stood down from the party after being charged with sexual abuse in July 2020. Six by-elections were held and resulted in a Labour gain from the Conservatives, two Labour holds, two Labour gains from the SNP and an independent hold.

Results

Ward summary

|- class="unsortable" align="centre"
!rowspan=2 align="left"|Ward
! % 
!Seats
! %
!Seats
! %
!Seats
! %
!Seats
! %
!Seats
! %
!Seats
! %
!Seats
!rowspan=2|Total
|- class="unsortable" align="center"
!colspan=2 | SNP
!colspan=2 | Labour
!colspan=2 | Conservatives
!colspan=2 | Green
!colspan=2 | BUP
!colspan=2 | Independents
!colspan=2 | Others
|-
|align="left"|Kilsyth
|37.4
|1
|bgcolor="" |52.4
|bgcolor="" |2
|6.4
|0
!colspan=6| 
|3.7
|0
|3
|-
|align="left"|Cumbernauld North
|bgcolor="" |50.3
|bgcolor="" |2
|27.7
|1
|14.2
|1
|4.1
|0
!colspan=4| 
|3.7
|0
|4
|-
|align="left"|Cumbernauld South
|bgcolor="" |51.8
|bgcolor="" |2
|35.5
|2
|7.9
|0
!colspan=4| 
|4.3
|0
|4.8
|0
|4
|-
|align="left"|Cumbernauld East
|bgcolor="" |58.5
|bgcolor="" |3
|23.2
|1
|8.8
|0
|4.2
|0
!colspan=2| 
|5.3
|0
!colspan=2| 
|4
|-
|align="left"|Stepps, Chryston and Muirhead
|bgcolor="" |36.4
|bgcolor="" |1
|34.7
|1
|15.0
|0
|10.8
|1
!colspan=4| 
|3.2
|0
|3
|-
|align="left"|Gartcosh, Glenboig and Moodiesburn
|bgcolor="" |46.8
|bgcolor="" |2
|39.2
|1
|9.4
|0
|4.5
|0
!colspan=6| 
|3
|-
|align="left"|Coatbridge North
|bgcolor="" |46.3
|bgcolor="" |2
|33.9
|2
|9.7
|0
!colspan=6| 
|10.1
|0
|4
|-
|align="left"|Airdrie North
|bgcolor="" |36.1
|bgcolor="" |2
|29.3
|1
|10.8
|0
!colspan=4| 
|22.0
|1
|1.7
|0
|4
|-
|align="left"|Airdrie Central
|41.6
|2
|bgcolor="" |42.2
|bgcolor="" |2
|13.7
|0
!colspan=6| 
|2.5
|0
|4
|-
|align="left"|Coatbridge West
|bgcolor="" |47.9
|bgcolor="" |2
|39.4
|1
|6.16
|0
!colspan=6| 
|6.5
|0
|3
|-
|align="left"|Coatbridge South
|bgcolor="" |53.2
|bgcolor="" |2
|34.9
|2
|6.7
|0
|2.1
|0
!colspan=2| 
|3.1
|0
!colspan=2| 
|4
|-
|align="left"|Airdrie South
|bgcolor="" |47.6
|bgcolor="" |2
|35.3
|1
|17.1
|1
!colspan=8| 
|4
|-
|align="left"|Fortissat
|30.8
|1
|bgcolor="" |36.5
|bgcolor="" |2
|11.2
|0
|2.6
|0
|18.8
|1
!colspan=4| 
|4
|-
|align="left"|Thorniewood
|36.8
|1
|bgcolor="" |43.4
|bgcolor="" |2
|7.1
|0
!colspan=4| 
|12.7
|0
!colspan=2| 
|3
|-
|align="left"|Bellshill
|bgcolor="" |40.8
|bgcolor="" |2
|38.8
|2
|13.6
|0
!colspan=6| 
|2.2
|0
|4
|-
|align="left"|Mossend and Holytown
|bgcolor="" |42.6
|bgcolor="" |2
|39.4
|2
|12.8
|0
!colspan=6| 
|5.2
|0
|3
|-
|align="left"|Motherwell West
|bgcolor="" |41.1
|bgcolor="" |2
|31.9
|1
|18.9
|1
|8.1
|0
!colspan=6| 
|3
|-
|align="left"|Motherwell North
|bgcolor="" |46.6
|bgcolor="" |2
|37.3
|2
|11.0
|0
!colspan=6| 
|5.0
|0
|4
|-
|align="left"|Motherwell South East and Ravenscraig
|bgcolor="" |42.8
|bgcolor="" |2
|31.2
|1
|16.7
|1
|7.8
|0
!colspan=6| 
|4
|-
|align="left"|Murdostoun
|29.7
|1
|28.7
|2
|9.1
|0
!colspan=4| 
|bgcolor="" |32.5
|bgcolor="" |1
!colspan=2| 
|4
|-
|align="left"|Wishaw
|bgcolor="" |45.4
|bgcolor="" |2
|36.1
|1
|18.5
|1
!colspan=8| 
|4
|- class="unsortable" class="sortbottom"
!align="left"| Total
!43.6
!36
!35.2
!32
!11.8
!5
!2.2
!1
!0.8
!1
!3.8
!2
!2.5
!0
!77
|}

Ward results

Kilsyth
2017: 2xLab; 1xSNP
2022: 2xLab; 1xSNP
2017-2022: No change

Cumbernauld North
2017: 2xSNP; 1xLab; 1xCon
2022: 2xSNP; 1xLab; 1xCon
2017-2022: No change

Cumbernauld South
2017: 3xSNP; 1xLab
2022: 2xSNP; 2xLab
2017-2022 Change: Lab gain one seat from SNP

Cumbernauld East
2017: 3xSNP; 1xLab
2022: 3xSNP; 1xLab
2017-2022: No change

Stepps, Chryston and Muirhead
2017: 1xSNP; 1xLab; 1xCon
2022: 1xSNP; 1xLab; 1xGreen
2017-2022 Change: Green gain one seat from Con

Gartcosh, Glenboig and Moodiesburn
2017: 2xLab; 1xSNP
2022: 1xLab; 2xSNP
2017-2022: SNP gain from Lab

Coatbridge North
2017: 2xSNP; 2xLab
2022: 2xSNP; 2xLab
2017-2022: No change

Airdrie North
2017: 1xSNP; 1xLab; 1xInd; 1xCon
2022: 2xSNP; 1xLab; 1xInd
2017-2022 Change: SNP gain one seat from Con

Airdrie Central
2017: 2xSNP; 1xLab; 1xCon
2022: 2xSNP; 2xLab
2017-2022 Change: Lab gain one seat from Con

Coatbridge West
2017: 2xLab; 1xSNP
2022: 2xSNP; 1xLab
2017-2022 Change: SNP gain one seat from Lab

Coatbridge South
2017: 2xSNP; 2xLab
2022: 2xSNP; 2xLab
2017-2022: No change

Airdrie South
2017: 2xSNP; 1xLab; 1xCon
2022: 2xSNP; 1xLab; 1xCon
2017-2022: No change

Fortissat
2017: 2xLab; 1xSNP; 1xCon
2022: 2xLab; 1xSNP; 1xBUP
2017-2022: BUP gain one seat from Con

Thorniewood
2017: 2xLab; 1xSNP
2022: 2xLab; 1xSNP
2017-2022: No change

Bellshill
2017: 2xLab; 1xSNP; 1xCon
2022: 2xLab; 2xSNP
2017-2022 Change: SNP gain one seat from Con

Mossend and Holytown
2017: 2xLab; 1xSNP
2022: 2xLab; 1xSNP
2017-2022: No change

Motherwell West
2017: 1xSNP; 1xLab; 1xCon
2022: 1xSNP; 1xLab; 1xCon
2017-2022: No change

Motherwell North
2017: 2xSNP; 2xLab
2022: 2xSNP; 2xLab
2017-2022: No change

Motherwell South East and Ravenscraig
2017: 2xSNP; 1xLab; 1xCon
2022: 2xSNP; 1xLab; 1xCon
2017-2022: No change

Murdostoun
2017: 2xLab; 1xSNP; 1xInd
2022: 2xLab; 1xSNP; 1xInd
2017-2022: No change

Wishaw
2017: 2xSNP; 1xLab; 1xCon
2022: 2xSNP; 1xLab; 1xCon
2017-2022 Change: No Change

Aftermath
The SNP won control of North Lanarkshire Council, which had been Labour-controlled since 1996, and Jordan Linden was appointed leader of the council on 24 May 2022. He lasted just two months in the role, however, resigning on 27 July following allegations of sexual misconduct. On 1 August, Linden's former deputy leader, Tracy Carragher was voted in as the leader of the SNP group with Alan Masterton as her deputy.

On 11 August, the SNP lost control of North Lanarkshire when Carragher failed to be voted in as the new council leader; a Labour motion to install Jim Logue, leader from 2016 until the 2022 elections, to his former post was passed by 38 votes to 37. The decisive vote came from long-time SNP councillor Michael Coyle, who defected to Labour shortly before the meeting.

Changes since 2022
 On 11 August 2022, Airdie South councillor Michael Coyle quit the SNP and defected to Scottish Labour.

Notes

References

2022
North Lanarkshire